Carl Körting (born 1881, date of death unknown) was a German gymnast. He competed in the men's artistic individual all-around event at the 1908 Summer Olympics.

References

1881 births
Year of death missing
German male artistic gymnasts
Olympic gymnasts of Germany
Gymnasts at the 1908 Summer Olympics
Place of birth missing